Raven is an unincorporated community in central Alberta within Red Deer County, located on Highway 54,  southwest of Red Deer. The Raven River flows near it.

Localities in Red Deer County